Songs is an album by Spiers and Boden. It consists of traditional British folk songs and sea shanties, apart from Innocent When you Dream which was written by Tom Waits for the soundtrack to the film "Franks Wild Years". It was released less than six months after their previous album Tunes. Four of these songs concern murder, which gives a dark tone to the album. It was recorded and released in October 2005.

Track listing

Personnel
Jon Boden (vocals, fiddle, guitar, concertina)
John Spiers (vocals, melodeons, concertina, bandoneon).

Spiers and Boden albums
2005 albums